James Burne Ferguson was a 19th-century Member of Parliament in New Zealand.

He represented the Wairarapa and Hawkes Bay electorate from 1858 to 1860, when he resigned. In the by-election on 22 July 1858, he was elected unopposed.

References

Members of the New Zealand House of Representatives
Year of death missing
Year of birth missing
New Zealand MPs for North Island electorates
19th-century New Zealand politicians